Francisco Peña (Pegna) (born at Villarroya de los Pinares, near Saragossa, about 1540; died at Rome, in 1612) was a Spanish canon lawyer.

Life 

He devoted himself to the study of law at Valencia. Later Philip II of Spain appointed him auditor of the Rota for Spain.

He formed one of the commissions charged with the preparation of the official edition of the Corpus juris canonici, published in 1582, and the anonymous notes appended to the edition of the Decretals are attributed to him. He was also concerned in the canonization of several saints: Didacus of Alcalá, Hyacinth, Raymond, Charles Borromeo, and Frances of Rome, publishing biographies of several of them.  Peña was an opponent of Robert Bellarmine's theory of the indirect power of the pope in temporal affairs.

Works 

His principal works are:
"In Directorium Inquisitorum a Nicolao Eimerico conscriptum commentaria" (Rome, 1578);
"De officio Inquisitionis" (Cremona, 1655);
"In Ambrosii de Vignate tractatum de hæresi commentaria et in Pauli Grillandi de hæreticis et eorum pœnis notæ" (Rome, 1581);
"In Bernardi Comensis Dominicani Lucernam inquisitorum notæ et ejusdem tractatum de strigibus" (Rome, 1584);
"Responsio canonica ad scriptum nuper editum in causa Henrici Borbonii quo illius fautores persuadere nituntur episcopos in Francia jure illos absolvere potuisse" (Rome, 1595);
"Censura in arrestum Parlamentale Curiæ criminalis Parisiensis contra Joannem Castellum et patres Societatis Jesu" (Rome, 1595);
"De temporali regno Christi" (Rome, 1611).

His "Decisiones sacræ Rotæ" were published by Urritigoiti (2 vols., Saragossa, 1648–50).

References 
 Stefan Bauer, The Invention of Papal History: Onofrio Panvinio between Renaissance and Catholic Reform (Oxford, 2020).
 Nicolaus Antonius, Bibliotheca Hispana nova, I (Madrid, 1783), 457-58.
 Johann Friedrich von Schulte, Die Geschichte der Quellen und Lit. des canonischen Rechts, III (Stuttgart, 1880), 734.

External links 
Catholic Encyclopedia article

1612 deaths
Canon law jurists
16th-century Spanish lawyers
Year of birth uncertain
17th-century Spanish lawyers